The Front Line is a 2009 Italian crime-drama film written and directed by Renato De Maria. It is based on the memoirs of the Prima Linea terrorist Sergio Segio.

Cast 

 Riccardo Scamarcio: Sergio Segio
 Giovanna Mezzogiorno: Susanna Ronconi
 Fabrizio Rongione:  Claudio
 Duccio Camerini: Segio's father
 Lino Guanciale: Piero
 Anita Kravos: Marina Premoli

References

External links

2009 films
2009 crime drama films
2000s biographical films
Biographical films about people convicted on terrorism charges
Films scored by Max Richter
Films based on biographies
Italian crime drama films
2000s Italian films